The 1994 Hi-Tec British Open Squash Championships was held at the Lambs Squash Club with the later stages being held at the Wembley Conference Centre in London from 4–11 April 1994. The event was won by Michelle Martin for the second consecutive year defeating Liz Irving in the final.

Seeds

Draw and results

Qualifying round

First round

Second round

Quarter-finals

Semi-finals

Final

References

Women's British Open Squash Championships
Women's British Open Squash Championship
Women's British Open Squash Championship
Squash competitions in London
Women's British Open Squash Championship
1994 in women's squash